Chamaecostus cuspidatus, common name fiery costus or spiral flag, is a species of herbaceous plant in the family Costaceae native to eastern Brazil (States of Bahia and Espirito Santo). In India, it is known as insulin plant for its purported anti-diabetic properties.

Chamaecostus cuspidatus has large fleshy looking leaves. The undersides of these large, smooth, dark green leaves have light purple shade. The leaves are spirally arranged around the stem, forming attractive, arching clumps arising from underground rootstocks. The maximum height of these plants is about two feet. Flowering occurs during the warm months. And they appear to be cone-like heads at the tips of branches.

Cultivation
In Siddha medicine, it is known as kostum.  It is being cultivated in Kashmir and the Himalayan regions for its root. It is related to the gingers and was originally part of the family Zingiberaceae. But now the Costus species and their kin have been reclassified into their own family, Costaceae. The species reproduces vegetative by rhizome and birds disperse seeds when they feed on the fruits. Costus products are sometimes called Costus comosus and are edible in nature. The flower petals are quite sweet and nutritious. It's a lower grower and makes a great ground cover. The long red flower spikes of Costus pulverulentus are unique to the family and they are sure to create interest in the garden. The plant grows very quickly. And the propagation is by stem cutting. It needs sunshine but it also grows in slightly shady areas. It is cultivated in India for its use in traditional medicine and elsewhere as an ornamental.

Traditional medicine
The dried leaves are used in Ayurvedic medicine.

References

Costaceae
Plants used in Ayurveda
Flora of Brazil